Checkerboarding may refer to:

Checkerboarding (beekeeping)
Checkerboarding (land)
Checkerboard rendering, a 3D computer graphics technique.